Kathleen Yearwood is a Canadian experimental singer-songwriter and author, born in 1958.

From Subterranean Records description of Kathleen Yearwood:

This powerful and very radical Canadian artist and her music have been described variously as a "folk banshee," "Joan Baez meets Diamanda Galás," and "when angels and demons collide," among many other superlatives, but the descriptions tend to fall flat before the real thing.

In a 1993 interview with the Calgary, Alberta newspaper VOX, Yearwood notes that "what I have for sale are songs about spirit in a culture that denies anything spiritual." She believes that her life and her art have been shaped by familial abuse, poverty, sexism, battering, and the corruption and materialism of the Canadian society in which she grew up. She has contributed for many years to the Prison justice movement in Canada.

Music
Yearwood was 12 years old when she began singing professionally in Calgary, Alberta. She worked as musician in Vancouver, British Columbia in her early 20s, and lived as well in Montreal, where she studied experimental music and tape composition at McGill University. Moving westward again, she ended up in rural Alberta, in the vicinity of Edmonton, where she assembled a band called Cheval de Guerre in the late 1980s.

Ordeal, Yearwood's more recent collaboration with Reg Elder and Paulus Kressman, "incorporate(s) noise, vocal multiphonics, improvisation, broken glass, silences, metal influences, literature and other unexpected devices".

She has performed throughout Canada and in Europe, playing shows at the Vancouver Folk Music Festival (1998) and the Under the Volcano Festival in 2003.  She has also performed at Victoriaville Festival of New Music (FIMAV) in Victoriaville, Quebec in 1999, and the Sergey Kuryokhin Festival of New Music (SKIF) in St. Petersburg, Russia in 2004

On her album "Little Misery Birds", Yearwood set three William Blake poems to music.

Writing
Yearwood has published several short stories and one novel, published by the University of Oslo in 2003. She describes Self Mutilation as a book about "the spiritual cost of poverty". The work contains some of the "folklore" collected in Canadian Prisons.

Discography
This Guitar Is Wrecked Part 2 (2017)
This Guitar Is Wrecked Part 1 (2017) 
Hunt the Circle (2013)
À la Claire Fantöme (2013)
Great Songs to Empty Rooms (2005)
Ordeal (2003) with Paulus Kressman
Dog Logic (2000)
Little Misery Birds (1995) Subterranean Records / Voice of the Turtle
Book of Hate (1994) Subterranean Records / Voice of the Turtle / Amatish
Universal Incest b/w Fille D'un Laboureaux EP -, (7" Coloured Vinyl) (1991)
Dead Branches Make a Noise (cassette) (1990) Subterranean Records
Housework (cassette) (1989)
Panik And Death (cassette 1988)

Bibliography
Self-Mutilation – University of Oslo, (2003)

References

External links
Official site.
Music.
The Ectophiles' Guide to Good Music: Kathleen Yearwood
Vancouver Folk Music Festival: Kathleen Yearwood
Canadian Indie Band Database: Kathleen Yearwood

1958 births
Living people
21st-century Canadian novelists
Canadian folk singer-songwriters
Canadian women singer-songwriters
Canadian women novelists
Canadian women composers
Musicians from Calgary
Writers from Calgary
21st-century Canadian women writers
21st-century Canadian women singers